Elizabeth Lunbeck is an American historian. She is Professor of the History of Science in Residence in the Department of the History of Science at Harvard University.

Books 
Lunbeck is the author or coauthor of books including:
 The Americanization of Narcissism (2014)
 Family Romance, Family Secrets:  Case Notes from an American Psychoanalysis, 1912 (with Bennett Simon, 2003)
 The Psychiatric Persuasion:  Knowledge, Gender, and Power in Modern America (1994)

Her edited volumes include:
 Histories of Scientific Observation (edited with Lorraine Daston, 2011)
 Science without Laws: Model Systems, Cases, Exemplary Narratives (edited with Angela Creager and M. Norton Wise, 2007)
 Feminism in Twentieth-Century Science, Technology, and Medicine (edited with Angela Creager and Londa Schiebinger, 2001)

References 

Living people
Harvard University faculty
American historians
Duke University alumni
Harvard University alumni
American women historians
Year of birth missing (living people)
Place of birth missing (living people)
21st-century American women